The Washington Jockey Club was an American association in Washington, D.C. devoted to horse racing, founded in 1797. The Club established its first racecourse four blocks from the Executive Mansion where it extended from 17th and 20th Streets and extending across Pennsylvania Avenue into Lafayette Park, what is now the site of Decatur House at H Street and Jackson Place, crossing Seventeenth Street and Pennsylvania Avenue to Twentieth Street, largely on the site of today’s Eisenhower Executive Office Building. The course was relocated in 1802 to the Holmead Farm two miles north of the Executive Mansion, to what is now Meridian Hill.

History

The inaugural match featured John Tayloe III's Lamplighter and Gen. Charles Carnan Ridgely's Cincinnatus, for 500 guineas, ran in 4-mile heats, and won by the former, a sire of Ridgeley's Imp English bred stallion Grey Medley. The only initial building was a small elevated platform for the judges. The "carriage folk" took to the infield for views of the contests, and the standing spectators crested the outside of the course.

Charles Ridgely raised thoroughbred horses which trained on the racetrack at his estate, Hampton. He promoted the stud services of his racehorse Grey Medley (f. 1776); his racehorse Post Boy (f. 1800) was destined to win the prestigious Washington Jockey Club cup in 1804, 1805, and 1806. John Tayloe III purchased and bred many thoroughbreds, including Diomed (f.1777) Grey Diomed (f. 1786), Dungannon (f. 1794), Selima (f. 1805), and Sir Archy (f. 1805)- considered the first great racehorse bred in America. Tayloe III built The Octagon House in downtown Washington City at the behest of his cousin, George Washington, and also owned a 204-acre horse farm called Petworth (Washington, D.C.), which stands on the land that now comprises the Petworth neighborhood. Wilhelmus Bryan, a historian of early Washington, attributed the popularity of horse racing in the new federal city "to the interest taken in breeding of racing stock by John Tayloe III, reputed to be the wealthiest man in the city.

John Tayloe II (1721-1779), father of John Tayloe III, was a fourth generation tobacco planter and avid horse racer. His property, Mount Airy (1758), exists today, Tayloe II’s earliest recorded importation was Childers (whose grandsire was  Flying Childers (1714–41)) in 1751. His son, Colonel John Tayloe III, went on to purchase and breed many thoroughbreds, including Grey Diomed (f. 1786), Dungannon (f. 1794), Selima (f. 1805), and Sir Archy (f. 1805). John Tayloe III built the Octagon in the Federal City, and also owned a 204 acre horse farm called Petworth, bounded on the south by Rock Creek Road and on the west by Georgia Avenue, which stood on the land that now comprises the Petworth neighborhood. The eager citizens who attended the four mile heat interpreted the race as a contest between the states; in this instance, Virginia was victorious and Tayloe carried home a purse of 500 guineas! first and foremost a horse farm.

In 1802 growth in the Federal City forced abandonment of the initial course, moving to the Holmead Farm, what is now Meridian Hill—south of Columbia Road between Fourteenth and Sixteenth Streets—and races were conducted at the Holmstead Farm's one mile oval track. Gen. John Peter Van Ness, Dr. William Thornton, G.W. P. Custis, John Threlkeld of Georgetown and George Calvert of Riversdale, Bladensburg, Maryland.

For a time Washington and Baltimore were leading centers for racing, and like today the best horses raced in the spring and fall. Presidents, military heroes, statesmen, and foreign dignitaries typically attended.

References 

Horse racing organizations in the United States
Tayloe family of Virginia